Apostolepis albicollaris is a species of snake in the family Colubridae. It is endemic to Brazil.

References 

albicollaris
Reptiles described in 2002
Reptiles of Brazil